is the Japanese term for a book that is not part of an anthology or corpus. The term is also used in reference to individual volumes of a manga series: most series first appear as individual chapters in a weekly or monthly manga anthology with other works before being published as  volumes containing several chapters each.

The  is one of the standard publishing formats for stand-alone books in Japan, alongside , a paperback size (105x173mm or 4.1"x6.8") commonly used for nonfiction publications, and bunkobon, a paperback size (105×148mm or 4.1"×5.8")  used for many types of publications, especially fiction.

Japanese comics (manga) 

 manga came to be published in thick, phone-book-sized weekly or monthly anthology manga magazines (such as Weekly Shōnen Magazine or Weekly Shōnen Jump). These anthologies often have hundreds of pages and dozens of individual series by multiple authors. They are printed on cheap newsprint and are considered disposable. Since the 1930s, though, comic strips had been compiled into  collecting multiple installments from a single series and reprinting them in a roughly paperback-sized volume on higher quality paper than in the original magazine printing. Strips in manga magazines and tankobon are typically printed in black and white, but sometimes certain sections may be printed in color or using colored inks or paper.

Japanese speakers frequently refer to manga  by the English loanword , although it is more widespread for being used in place of the word "manga", as they are the same thing. The term also refers to the format itself—a comic collection in a trade paperback sized (roughly ) book (as opposed to the larger  format used by traditional American graphic novels). Although Japanese manga tankobon may be in various sizes, the most common are Japanese B6 and ISO A5. The  format has made inroads in the American comics market, with several major publishers opting to release some of their titles in this smaller format, which is sometimes also called "digest format" or "digest size". In the United States, many manga are released in the so-called "Tokyopop trim" or "Tokyopop size" (approximately ).

Special formats

Aizōban 
An  is a collector's edition volume. These volumes are generally more expensive and lavished with special features such as special covers created specifically for the edition. A special paper used for the cover, higher quality paper, a special slipcase, etc.  are generally printed in a limited run, thereby increasing the value and collectability of those few copies made. The  format has begun to make inroads into the US market, with titles such as Fruits Basket and Mobile Suit Gundam: The Origin being reissued in a similar format. Generally, only the most popular manga are released in this format.

Bunkoban 

Thus, the  edition of a given manga will consist of fewer volumes. For example, Please Save My Earth was published in 21  volumes, and then re-released in 12  volumes. If the original manga was a wide-ban release, the  release will generally have the same number of volumes. The term is commonly abbreviated in Japanese to just  (without the -).

Gōkaaizōban 
A  is another term occasionally used to designate a type of special release.

Kanzenban 
The  is yet another term sometimes used to denote a type of special release. A  release is generally A5 size and will typically reproduce individual chapter covers, color pages, and side-stories from its original magazine run, features that are often omitted or converted to grayscale in standard  releases. While the  appellation emphasizes the value of the volumes, the term  emphasizes their completeness, though it is generally reserved for more popular manga.

Shinsōban 
The volumes in such a release usually have new color pages and other extras. For example, in 2002, Sailor Moon was re-edited; some pages were completely redrawn, and most dialogues were rewritten by the author. Plus, the chapters were redivided to fit into 12 volumes instead of 18.

Sōshūhen 
The  is a format published by Shueisha beginning in 2008. The majority of  releases are for popular manga with ongoing serializations. They also contain far more pages than a standard  and thus feature more chapters in fewer volumes; Naruto Part I was originally published in 27  volumes, but was completed in just eight  volumes.

Wide-ban 
A wide-ban or  edition is larger (A5 size) than a regular . Many manga, particularly  and  manga, are published in wide-ban editions after magazine serialization, and are never released in the  format that is common in  manga and  manga. When a series originally published in  format is re-released in wide-ban format, each volume will contain more pages than in the original edition, and therefore the series will consist of fewer volumes. For example, Maison Ikkoku was originally released in 15  volumes, but was republished as 10 wide-ban volumes.

See also 

Omnibus edition
Trade paperback
List of best-selling manga

References 

Anime and manga terminology
Japanese books
Japanese words and phrases
Books by type
Comics formats